Great Gale may refer to the following weather events:

 Great September Gale of 1815 – New England
 Great Gale of 1861 – Hartlepool and the north east coast of England, Saturday 9 February 1861
 Great Gale of 1865 – Table Bay, South Africa, 17 May 1865
 Great Gale of 1871 – Bridlington and north east coast of England, Friday 10 February 1871
 Great Gale of 1880 – Oregon, 9 January 1880

See also 
European windstorm
Great Storm (disambiguation)